Warrensburg Township is an inactive township in Johnson County, in the U.S. state of Missouri.

Warrensburg Township was established in 1836, taking its name from the community of Warrensburg, Missouri.

References

Townships in Missouri
Townships in Johnson County, Missouri